{{DISPLAYTITLE:C15H13NO3}} 
The molecular formula C15H13NO3 (molar mass: 255.27 g/mol) may refer to:

 Amfenac, also known as 2-amino-3-benzoylbenzeneacetic acid
 Dinoxyline
 Ketorolac
 Polyfothine
 Pranoprofen

Molecular formulas